USS Seatag (SP-505), also spelled Sea Tag, was a United States Navy patrol vessel in commission from 1917 to 1918.

Seatag was built in 1917 as a private motorboat of the same name by the Great Lakes Boatbuilding Corporation at Milwaukee, Wisconsin. On 9 July 1917, the U.S. Navy acquired her under a free lease from her owner, Donald Ryerson of Chicago, Illinois, for use as a section patrol vessel during World War I. She was commissioned as USS Seatag or Sea Tag (SP-505) on 1 August 1917.

Seatag served on the Great Lakes for the rest of World War I. She served primarily on the Detroit River and St. Clair River patrols until 4 October 1918.

Seatag was decommissioned on 18 November 1918, a week after the end of World War I. She was returned to Ryerson on 7 March 1919.

Notes

References

Department of the Navy Naval History and Heritage Command Online Library of Selected Images: Civilian Ships: Sea Tag (American Motor Boat, 1917). Served as USS Sea Tag (SP-505) in 1917-1919 Name also spelled Seatag
NavSource Online: Section Patrol Craft Photo Archive: Seatag (SP 505)

Patrol vessels of the United States Navy
World War I patrol vessels of the United States
Ships built in Milwaukee
1917 ships
Great Lakes ships